Ernest Blackwell (19 July 1894 – 16 October 1964) was a footballer who played as a goalkeeper, spending the majority of his career at his hometown club of Sheffield United. Born in Sheffield he was the cousin of England keeper Sam Hardy and brother of  Aberdeen keeper Harry Blackwell.

Career
Blackwell made his name at Scunthorpe & Lindsey United before being signed by Sheffield United in May 1914. He was seen as understudy to Harold Gough and Ted Hufton and as such his appearances were limited throughout his time at Bramall Lane.  Having spent some time in the navy as a fitness instructor, he remained at the club for the duration of World War I, making sporadic appearances for the Blades and guesting for Leicester Fosse, Crystal Palace and cross town rivals Sheffield Wednesday.

After the war, Blackwell seemed happy with his role at the club, making only infrequent appearances, the highlight of his career coming when he played in the 1923 FA Cup semi-final.  Injuries began to take their toll and after a bout of appendicitis he was advised that a blow to the abdomen could have terminal results and he was forced to retire. In recognition of his service, United presented him with a grant of £500 to commence a new business venture, a hire purchase warehouse unit in the Spital Hill area of Sheffield as well as becoming the landlord of several semi-detached houses in the Norton area of Sheffield.

Personal life
Blackwell was a committed Methodist and a practising lay-preacher meaning he would sometimes miss fixtures played on religious dates.  He died, aged 70, in his home town of Sheffield.

References

1894 births
1964 deaths
Footballers from Sheffield
English footballers
English Football League players
Association football goalkeepers
Forgemasters Sports & Social F.C. players
Scunthorpe United F.C. players
Sheffield United F.C. players
Sheffield Wednesday F.C. wartime guest players
Crystal Palace F.C. wartime guest players
Leicester City F.C. wartime guest players